The Tipaza district is an Algerian Berber Speaking administrative district in the Tipaza province and its capital is located on the eponymous city of Tipaza.

Location 
The district is located in the north of the Tipaza province.

Communes 
The district is composed of only one commune: Tipaza.

References 

Districts of Ouargla Province

Districts of Tipaza Province